"Holiday" is a song by Nazareth from their 1980 album Malice in Wonderland. The single reached No. 87 on the Billboard Hot 100, their only charting song apart from Love Hurts. The music video features the arcade game "Super Road Champions". The song has also appeared on the 2002 compilation album "Nazology: Best of Nazareth". Allmusic's Donald Guarisco gave of positive review of the song in his review of the Malice in Wonderland album.

Charts

Certifications

References

1980 songs
1980 singles
Nazareth (band) songs
A&M Records singles